McCool is an Irish surname.

People
Notable people with the surname include:

Alex McCool (1923–2020), American NASA manager
Billy McCool (1944–2014), professional baseball player
Colin McCool (1916–1986), Australian cricket player
Courtney McCool (born 1988), American gymnast
Felix J. McCool (1912–1972), American Marine held as prisoner of war in both World War II and Korea
Michelle McCool, professional wrestler and diva for WWE
Robert McCool, software developer and architect, author of Apache HTTP Server.
William Cameron McCool (1961–2003), crew member and pilot of the final mission of Space Shuttle Columbia

Fictional characters
Cool McCool, 1960s cartoon spy in an animated TV show of the same name
Droopy McCool, fictional Star Wars character and member of the Max Rebo Band
Harry McCool, cartoon cop in the 1960s animated TV show Cool McCool
Tom McCool, cartoon cop in the 1960s animated TV show Cool McCool
Orla McCool, fictional character from TV series Derry Girls

See also
Fionn mac Cumhaill (aka "Finn McCool"), character from Irish mythology
 Cool (surname)
 Cools (surname)

Anglicised Irish-language surnames